Val-d'Aigoual is a commune in the Gard department in southern France. It was established on 1 January 2019 by merger of the former communes of Valleraugue (the seat) and Notre-Dame-de-la-Rouvière.

Geography

Climate

Val-d'Aigoual has a warm-summer Mediterranean climate (Köppen climate classification Csb) closely bordering on a hot-summer Mediterranean climate (Csa).

See also
Communes of the Gard department

References

Communes of Gard
Populated places established in 2019
2019 establishments in France